Tight binding in physics describes electronic band structure.

Tight binding may also refer to:

Tight adhesion in Leukocyte extravasation
Kinbaku (緊縛), meaning "tight binding", in Japanese bondage